Weihnachten is the seventh studio album by German singer Helene Fischer. It was released on 13 November 2015 by Polydor.

Track listing

Charts

Weekly charts

Year-end charts

Decade-end charts

Certifications and sales

References

External links
 Helene-Fischer.de — official site

2015 albums
German-language albums
2015 Christmas albums 
Christmas albums by German artists